Patrick Davis (born December 28, 1986) is an American former professional ice hockey player. He last played right wing for KalPa of the SM-liiga (SM-l).

Early life 
Davis was born in Warsaw, Indiana, and raised in Metro Detroit, where he played youth hockey.

Career 
Davis was drafted 99th overall in the 2005 NHL Entry Draft by the New Jersey Devils.

During the 2008–09 season, Davis made his NHL debut with the New Jersey Devils. On January 23, 2010, he scored his first career NHL goal in a game against the Toronto Maple Leafs. During the 2010–11 season, he was traded to the San Jose Sharks along with Mike Swift in exchange for Steven Zalewski and Jay Leach.

During the 2011–12 season he played for EHC Wolfsburg Grizzly Adams a professional ice hockey club of the German professional Deutsche Eishockey Liga. In August 2012, he left Wolfsburg to sign as a free agent with CSKA Moscow of the Russian Kontinental Hockey League playing under General Manager Sergei Fedorov whose father, Viktor, was Patrick's coach in minor hockey.

For a third consecutive season, Davis moved within Europe, to sign a one-year contract with Finnish club, SaiPa of the SM-liiga on July 5, 2013.

Career statistics

References

External links

1986 births
Living people
Albany Devils players
Albany River Rats players
American men's ice hockey left wingers
Grizzlys Wolfsburg players
HC CSKA Moscow players
Ice hockey players from Michigan
Sportspeople from Sterling Heights, Michigan
Kitchener Rangers players
Lowell Devils players
New Jersey Devils draft picks
New Jersey Devils players
Oulun Kärpät players
Sioux City Musketeers players
Windsor Spitfires players
Worcester Sharks players